Rodolfo Hammersley (born June 10, 1889, date of death unknown) was a Chilean  track and field athlete who competed in the 1912 Summer Olympics.

He was born in Valparaíso and was the father of Andrés Hammersley and Arturo Hammersley. He was a generalist in track and field, practising a wide variety of events. In 1910 he was timed at 10.4 seconds for the 100 metres, which would have equalled the world record at that time.

In the 1912 Summer Olympics he finished 13th in the standing high jump event and 28th in the high jump competition. This made Hammersley part of Chile's first official delegation to the Olympics.

At the 1918 South American Championships in Athletics – the first such gathering in the region – he won the discus throw event and was runner-up in the hammer throw as well.

References

1889 births
Year of death missing
Sportspeople from Valparaíso
Chilean male sprinters
Chilean male discus throwers
Chilean male hammer throwers
Olympic athletes of Chile
Athletes (track and field) at the 1912 Summer Olympics